"What These Bitches Want" (edited for radio as "What You Want" or "What They Really Want" ) is a song by American rapper DMX, released as the third single from his third album ... And Then There Was X (1999). The single features Def Soul singer Sisqó from Dru Hill. The subject matter in the song is past women in DMX's life. Nokio the N-Tity, Sisqó's fellow Dru Hill bandmate, produced "What These Bitches Want" and provides additional vocals.

In August 2019, the song regained prominence on social media 19 years after its initial release date when a DMX challenge surfaced on the internet. For the challenge, women piece together photos and clips of themselves in various hairstyles, switching the images to the song's lyrics to suggest that they're a different person with every hairstyle.

Music video
The music video was directed by Hype Williams.

Charts

Certifications

References

External links

1999 songs
2000 singles
DMX (rapper) songs
Sisqó songs
Ruff Ryders Entertainment singles
Def Jam Recordings singles
East Coast hip hop songs
Rhythm and blues songs
Music videos directed by Hype Williams
Songs written by DMX (rapper)
Songs written by Sisqó